Carl Anthony Furillo (March 8, 1922 – January 21, 1989), nicknamed "The Reading Rifle" and "Skoonj", was an American professional baseball right fielder who played in Major League Baseball (MLB), spending his entire career with the Brooklyn/Los Angeles Dodgers. Noted for his strong and accurate throwing arm, he recorded ten or more assists in nine consecutive seasons, leading the league twice, and retired with the fifth-most games in right field (1,408) in NL history.

Early years, minor league baseball
Furillo was born in Stony Creek Mills, Pennsylvania. He was born from Italian immigrants from Campania. His father was from the province of Caserta and his mother was from the province of Benevento. He left school in the eighth grade, and often felt awkward among his teammates as a result; they would later recall that he rarely socialized with players who were better-educated. He signed with the Reading, Pennsylvania, team in the Interstate League, earning one of his nicknames with his powerful arm; the Dodgers were sufficiently impressed by his ability that they purchased the entire minor league franchise to acquire him. His other nickname, "Skoonj", came from the Italian word scungilli ("snail"), which was his favorite dish.

Major league career
He was one of the key members on the Dodgers'  champions, hitting .322 (4th in the NL) with 18 home runs, and placing among the league's top ten players in RBI (106), slugging average (.506), hits (177), runs (95), triples (10) and total bases (278); he finished sixth in the voting for the MVP Award. In 1950 he batted .305 (7th in the league) with 18 home runs, 106 RBI, and a career-high 99 runs. He achieved a personal best with 197 hits, finishing third in the NL for the second year in a row, for the 1951 team which lost a legendary pennant playoff to the New York Giants; he also batted .295 (9th in the NL) with 91 RBI and 93 runs.

He became skilled at negotiating balls hit off the high right-field wall at Ebbets Field, and after he led the NL in assists in both 1950 (18) and 1951 (24), opposing runners were increasingly reluctant to challenge his arm. On August 27, 1951, he threw out Pittsburgh Pirates pitcher Mel Queen by two feet at first base after Queen had apparently singled into right field. During spring training of 1952, the New York Journal-American called Furillo "one of the best players in the game," calling his style one of "close mechanical perfection." Furillo batted only .247 for the  pennant winners, though he was selected to his first All-Star team. Diagnosed with cataracts, he had surgery in the offseason and returned with perhaps his best season, winning the batting title and collecting 21 home runs and 92 RBI with a career-best 38 doubles (3rd in the NL). His .344 average was the highest by a right-handed Dodgers hitter since Oyster Burns hit .354 in 1894; Tommy Davis bettered him with a .346 mark in 1962. He was again named an All-Star, ending the year fifth in the league in slugging (.580), and finished ninth in the MVP balloting.

Furillo's season ended on September 6 against the Giants – he was batting against Rubén Gómez in the second inning, and opposing manager Leo Durocher was yelling for Gomez to "stick it in his ear"; Furillo was hit on the wrist by a pitch, and proceeded to first base, but with a 3–2 count on the next batter, Durocher and Furillo charged towards each other. Furillo got Durocher in a headlock, and in the ensuing brawl, Monte Irvin of the Giants stepped on Furillo's hand, fracturing a knuckle on his little finger.

For the  champions he was seventh in the league with a .314 average, along with 95 RBI and a career high of 26 homers. With the  team which repeated as NL champions, earning the team's seventh pennant in ten years, he slipped to a .289 average but maintained solid power totals with 21 homers, 83 RBI and 30 doubles. He hit .306 in the Dodgers' last season in Brooklyn in 1957, and batted .290 in their first year in Los Angeles, finishing eighth in the league with 83 RBI. With the  pennant team, his playing time was reduced to only 50 games, with just 25 of them in the outfield. But he had one last highlight in the playoff series against the Milwaukee Braves when he beat out a ground ball in the 12th inning of the second and final game, with Gil Hodges scoring from second base to win the NL flag.

Release and controversy
The Dodgers released Furillo in May  while he was injured with a torn calf muscle; he sued the team, claiming they released him to avoid both the higher pension due a 15-year player and medical expenses, eventually collecting $21,000. He later maintained he was blackballed as a result and was unable to find a job within the sport – a charge denied by Commissioner Ford Frick.

World Series exploits
Furillo played in seven World Series with the Dodgers, six of them against the New York Yankees, winning in 1955 and in 1959 against the Chicago White Sox. He had an excellent 1947 World Series, batting .353 in a seven-game loss; he had two RBI and scored a run in a 9–8 Game 3 victory, and scored the run which gave Brooklyn the lead for good in an 8–6 win in Game 6. He preserved a 6–5 victory in Game 5 of the 1952 World Series when he made a spectacular catch over the fence of an apparent home run by Johnny Mize – who had already homered three times in the Series – with one out in the eleventh inning. In the 1953 World Series he hit .333, and drove in the tying run in the seventh inning of Game 1, though Brooklyn went on to lose; in the final Game 6, his 2-run homer with one out in the ninth tied the game 3–3, but New York scored in the bottom of the inning to win the game and the Series. In the victorious 1955 Series he started the scoring with a solo home run in his first at bat of Game 1, which New York won 6–5. In Game 7 he advanced Roy Campanella to third base on a groundout in the fourth inning, with Campanella later scoring, and was walked intentionally with one out and runners on second and third in the sixth, with another run following on a sacrifice fly by Hodges. The two runs held up for a 2–0 victory, and Brooklyn earned the only World Series title in franchise history. In the 1959 Series he was limited to four pinch-hitting appearances and his 2-run single in the seventh inning of Game 3 broke a scoreless tie. Los Angeles held on for a 3–1 win.

Statistical summary
In his 15-year career, Furillo batted .299 with 192 home runs, 1,910 hits, 1,058 RBI, 895 runs, 324 doubles, 56 triples, 48 stolen bases, a .458 slugging average and 514 walks for a .355 on-base percentage. As an outfielder, he had 3,322 putouts, 151 assists, 34 double plays and 74 errors for 3,547 total chances and a .979 fielding percentage.
If he had one more hit in his career, he would have statistically had a .300 batting average.

In 40 World Series games, he batted .266 (34-for-128) with 13 runs, 9 doubles, 2 home runs, 13 RBI and 13 walks.

After baseball
After retiring as a player, Furillo left the sport for good. While writing his 1972 book The Boys of Summer about the 1952 and 1953 pennant-winning teams, author Roger Kahn located Furillo installing elevators at the World Trade Center. During the mid-1960s, he owned and operated a deli in Flushing, Queens. Furillo later worked as a night watchman; he developed leukemia, and died in Stony Creek Mills, Pennsylvania at 66 years of age of an apparent heart attack. Although Furillo felt that baseball completely forgot about him and his accomplishments, his funeral was attended by many of his Dodger teammates, including hall-of-famers Sandy Koufax and Duke Snider. He is interred at Forest Hills Memorial Park in Reiffton, Pennsylvania.

In a 1976 Esquire magazine article, sportswriter Harry Stein published an "All Time All-Star Argument Starter", consisting of five ethnic baseball teams. Furillo was the right fielder on Stein's Italian team.

See also

List of Major League Baseball career runs batted in leaders
List of Major League Baseball batting champions
List of Major League Baseball players who spent their entire career with one franchise

References

 Baseball: The Biographical Encyclopedia (2000). Kingston, New York: Total/Sports Illustrated. .

External links

Carl Furillo at SABR (Baseball BioProject)
Carl Furillo at Baseball Biography

Carl Furillo at The Deadball Era

1922 births
1989 deaths
American people of Italian descent
American expatriate baseball players in Canada
Baseball players from Pennsylvania
Brooklyn Dodgers players
Los Angeles Dodgers players
Major League Baseball right fielders
Montreal Royals players
National League All-Stars
National League batting champions
People from Berks County, Pennsylvania
Pocomoke City Chicks players
Reading Brooks players
Reading Chicks players
Sportspeople from the Delaware Valley